Lestidium atlanticum, the Atlantic barracudina, is a species of fish. It is widely distributed in tropical and subtropical waters of the three major oceans.

See also 
 List of fish of the Mediterranean Sea

References 

 Post, A., 1990. Paralepididae. p. 373-384. In J.C. Quero, J.C. Hureau, C. Karrer, A. Post and L. Saldanha (eds.) Check-list of the fishes of the eastern tropical Atlantic (CLOFETA). JNICT, Lisbon; SEI, Paris; and UNESCO, Paris. Vol. 1.

External links 

 Long Light-organ Barracudina @ Fishes of Australia

Paralepididae
Fish of the Atlantic Ocean
Fish of the Pacific Ocean
Marine fish of Western Australia
Taxa named by Nikolai Andreyevich Borodin
Fish described in 1928